Ahsham Qaedha (also Romanized as Aḩshām Qā’edhā and Aḩshām Qāyedhā; also known as Ahahām Qāidān, Aḩshām-e Qā’dhā, Ahsham Ghayedha, and Aḩshām Qeydān) is a village in Khvormuj Rural District, in the Central District of Dashti County, Bushehr Province, Iran. At the 2006 census, its population was 133, in 33 families.

References 

Populated places in Dashti County